Horrorscope is the second studio album by American rock band Eve 6. It was recorded at NRG Recording Studios in North Hollywood, California. The album was influenced by Lit's A Place in the Sun (1999). It was released on July 25, 2000, through RCA Records. The neologism "Horrorscope" is not actually used within the album's lyrics; though the chorus of "Sunset Strip Bitch" contains the proper word "horoscope."

Singles
The first single, "Promise", was a hit on alternative rock radio, reaching #3 on the US Modern Rock Tracks chart and #25 on the Mainstream Rock Tracks chart.  Around this time, "On the Roof Again" made it to #19 on the Modern Rock Tracks chart.  The follow-up single, "Here's to the Night" was a major mainstream hit in 2001, reaching #30 on the Billboard Hot 100. "Here's to the Night" became a hit at senior proms and graduation parties.

Critical reception

Horrorscope was met with "mixed or average" reviews from critics. At Metacritic, which assigns a weighted average rating out of 100 to reviews from mainstream publications, this release received an average score of 53 based on 10 reviews.

In a review for AllMusic, critic reviewer MacKenzie Wilson said: "It's another conventional rock record with thrashing guitar hooks and throbbing basslines firmly in place, but frontman Max Collins has lyrically improved. There isn't anything intellectually impressive and the hyperactive little boy excitement is still present, but a lush sweet side also shines through the album." David Hiltbrand of Entertainment Weekly wrote "the band's music and lyrics often still sound labored."

Commercial performance
The album was certified Gold by the RIAA in the U.S., and also by the CRIA in Canada in 2001.

Track listing

Personnel
Max Collins – bass, lead vocals
Jon Siebels – guitar, backing vocals
Tony Fagenson – drums
Additional
David Campbell—String arrangements on "Here's to the Night"

Charts

Certifications

References

Sources

External links

2000 albums
Eve 6 albums
RCA Records albums